Aarathi (born 1954) is an Indian actress who mainly acted in Kannada films during the 1970s and 1980s. She has won the Filmfare awards South and the Karnataka State Film Award for Best Actress four times each. After her retirement from films in the mid-1980s, she staged a comeback in 2005 as a director with Mithayi Mane which met with critical appreciation and also won her the Karnataka State Film Award for Best Children's Film. 

She was also nominated as a Member of the Legislative Council of the Vidhana parishad, making her only the second actress after B. Jayamma to be so nominated.

Career
After a short role in Gejje Pooje (1969), Aarathi starred as a leading actress in over 120 films including Naagarahaavu, Edakallu Guddada Mele, Bili Hendthi, Dharmasere, Paduvaaralli Pandavaru, Ranganayaki, Hombisilu, Upasane and Shubhamangala. Her collaboration with director Puttanna Kanagal included twelve films. In 1986 she directed the TV series, Namma Nammalli.

Filmography

As director

As actress

References

External links
 

Kannada actresses
Indian film actresses
Actresses in Kannada cinema
Kannada film directors
Actresses in Tamil cinema
Actresses in Telugu cinema
20th-century Indian actresses
Actresses from Mysore
Living people
Filmfare Awards South winners
1954 births
Indian women film directors
People from Hassan district
Film directors from Karnataka
21st-century Indian film directors
21st-century Indian actresses
Actresses in Malayalam cinema